Carl A. "Collie" Druhot (September 4, 1881 – February 5, 1918) was a Major League Baseball pitcher who played for the Cincinnati Reds in 1906 and the St. Louis Cardinals  in 1906 and 1907.

References

External links

1880s births
1918 deaths
Major League Baseball pitchers
Baseball players from Ohio
St. Louis Cardinals players
Cincinnati Reds players
Portland Browns players
Bellingham Gillnetters players
Portland Beavers players
Altoona Mountaineers players
York White Rozes players
Reading Pretzels players
Indianapolis Indians players
Butte Miners players
Missoula (minor league baseball) players
Accidental deaths in Oregon